Cheirisophus can refer to two different men from classical antiquity:
Cheirisophus (general), a Spartan general who fought in the Greco-Persian Wars.
Cheirisophus (sculptor), an ancient Greek artist